A command language is a language for job control in computing. It is a domain-specific and interpreted language; common examples of a command language are shell or batch programming languages. 

These languages can be used directly at the command line, but can also automate tasks that would normally be performed manually at the command line. They share this domain—lightweight automation—with scripting languages, though a command language usually has stronger coupling to the underlying operating system. Command languages often have either very simple grammars or syntaxes very close to natural language, to shallow the learning curve, as with many other domain-specific languages.

See also
 Command-line interface
 In the Beginning... Was the Command Line
 Batch processing
 Job (computing)

Notes

External links
A longer definition.

Programming language topics